William James Mudie Larnach    (27 January 1833 – 12 October 1898) was a New Zealand businessman and politician. He is known for his extravagant incomplete house near Dunedin called Larnach's castle by his opponents and now known as Larnach Castle. He is also remembered for his suicide within parliament buildings when faced with bankruptcy and consequent loss of his seat in parliament.

Early career 
Larnach was born in the Hunter Region, north of Sydney, Australia, the son of John Larnach, a station owner and Emily daughter of James Mudie. He was well-connected. For example his uncle Donald Larnach became a director of the Australian board of the Bank of New South Wales in 1846 and after his retirement to England became one of the leading financial authorities in the City of London. Larnach was also a family friend of W. J. T. Clarke, said at that time to be the richest man in Australasia. In his late twenties, after his 1859 marriage to Eliza Jane Guise, daughter of Richard Guise, Larnach joined the Bank of New South Wales. By 1867 he was their Geelong branch manager and after an extended holiday in Europe with his family he was picked by the London board of the Bank of Otago to replace their New Zealand manager. Larnach arrived in Dunedin in September 1867 and took up his new post.

He soon became quite prosperous, gathering large amounts of money through land speculation, farming investments, and a timber business. Between 1873 and 1887, Larnach constructed a large mansion, on the ridge of Otago Peninsula. Originally named "The Camp" by Larnach, it is now known as "Larnach Castle". Larnach himself took up residence in 1874. He was appointed a Companion of the Order of St Michael and St George in the 1879 Birthday Honours.

Politics 

On this occasion, he was defeated by his opponent, Robert Stout. Several months later, however, he was elected to the City of Dunedin electorate. In 1877, at the behest of his South Island colleagues, he introduced a successful no-confidence motion against Harry Atkinson, the Premier of the day. Under the new Premier, George Grey, Larnach was appointed Colonial Treasurer (now Minister of Finance). He later undertook a long trip to England to arrange a government loan, although he also took advantage of the opportunity to launch a new business venture, the New Zealand Agricultural Company. Larnach's farming investments were turning sour due to the rabbit problems, and Larnach sought to sell his lands to British investors—this prompted considerable condemnation in New Zealand, as Larnach was seen as trying to deceive the British as to the quality of the investments. The New Zealand Agricultural Company was not a success, and the affair cost Larnach many friends and allies in New Zealand.

With land prices falling and his timber company also suffering, Larnach's financial position was declining. Larnach became depressed, and withdrew from society. He is reported to have begun drinking heavily. He eventually became insolvent, although Larnach Castle and various other assets had been transferred to the ownership of his wife, Eliza, and were therefore spared. In 1880, his wife died, and Larnach married Mary Cockburn Alleyne, her half-sister, in 1882. She died in 1887, and in 1891, he married his third wife, Constance de Bathe Brandon. In 1888, he briefly attempted to restart his career in Melbourne, but returned to Dunedin within a year.

He devoted considerable effort to seeking government assistance for the New Zealand Agricultural Company. In 1885, he became Minister of Mines in the second Stout–Vogel Ministry. He affiliated himself with the Liberal Party, which was a somewhat surprising decision, given his associations with the business elite that the Liberals opposed.

Suicide 

In 1894, Larnach became a director of the Colonial Bank of New Zealand, having previously become a shareholder, but the Bank collapsed the following year leaving Larnach on the brink of financial ruin.

In an explanation to Parliament on 25 October 1895 he said that being an interested party, he refrained from voting on banking legislation. But on that day he mistakenly voted for a third reading of the Banking Act Amendment Bill (which involved the Colonial Bank), thinking he was voting on the following bill, the Horowhenua Block Bill.

In 1898, Larnach locked himself in a committee room at Parliament and shot himself with a revolver. His surviving family fought a battle over his will.

Owen Marshall wrote a novel The Larnachs (2011), based on the possibility that the tragedy resulted from an affair between Larnach's third wife Constance and his youngest son Douglas (Dougie).

Larnach is buried in the Dunedin Northern Cemetery. The family mausoleum is the cemetery's most imposing structure, and is a miniature replica of Robert Lawson's First Church.

See also 
 Larnach Castle

Further reading

Notes

Works by Larnach

Works about Larnach

External links 
 

1833 births
1898 deaths
New Zealand Companions of the Order of St Michael and St George
Members of the New Zealand House of Representatives
New Zealand businesspeople
New Zealand finance ministers
New Zealand Liberal Party MPs
New Zealand politicians who committed suicide
Australian emigrants to New Zealand
People from New South Wales
Suicides by firearm in New Zealand
New Zealand MPs for Dunedin electorates
Burials at Dunedin Northern Cemetery
People from Otago Peninsula
Unsuccessful candidates in the 1890 New Zealand general election
19th-century New Zealand politicians
1890s suicides